Alexander Mereskin (born December 3, 1987) is a Russian professional ice hockey centre currently playing with Torpedo Ust-Kamenogorsk of the Supreme Hockey League (VHL).

Playing career
A veteran of 12 professional seasons, Mereskin opted to join HC Sochi on a two-year deal as a free agent on May 3, 2016.

After spending the 2017–18 season with Severstal Cherepovets, Mereskin continued his journeyman career in joining Admiral Vladivostok on a one-year contract on July 12, 2018.

References

External links

1987 births
Living people
Admiral Vladivostok players
HC Lada Togliatti players
Metallurg Novokuznetsk players
Krylya Sovetov Moscow players
Russian ice hockey centres
Salavat Yulaev Ufa players
Severstal Cherepovets players
HC Sochi players
HC Spartak Moscow players
Ice hockey people from Moscow